The Peace of Augsburg, also called the Augsburg Settlement, was a treaty between Charles V, Holy Roman Emperor, and the Schmalkaldic League, signed in September 1555 at the imperial city of Augsburg. It officially ended the religious struggle between the two groups and made the legal division of Christianity permanent within the Holy Roman Empire, allowing rulers to choose either Lutheranism or Roman Catholicism as the official confession of their state. However, the Peace of Augsburg arrangement is also credited with ending much Christian unity around Europe. Calvinism was not allowed until the Peace of Westphalia.

The Peace of Augsburg has been described as "the first step on the road toward a European system of sovereign states." The system, created on the basis of the Augsburg Peace, collapsed at the beginning of the 17th century, which was one of the reasons for the Thirty Years' War.

Overview
The Peace ran over the principle Cuius regio, eius religio ("whose realm, his religion"), which allowed the princes of states within the Holy Roman Empire to adopt either Lutheranism or Catholicism within the domains they controlled, ultimately reaffirming their sovereignty over those domains. Subjects, citizens, or residents who did not wish to conform to the prince's choice were given a grace period in which they were free to emigrate to different regions in which their desired religion had been accepted.

Article 24 stated: "In case our subjects, whether belonging to the old religion or the Augsburg Confession, should intend leaving their homes with their wives and children to settle in another, they shall be hindered neither in the sale of their estates after due payment of the local taxes nor injured in their honor."

Charles V had made an interim ruling, the Augsburg Interim of 1548, on the legitimacy of two religious creeds in the empire, and this was codified in law on 30 June 1548 upon the insistence of Charles V, who wanted to work out religious differences under the auspices of a general council of the Catholic Church. The Interim largely reflected principles of religious behavior in its 26 articles, although it allowed for marriage of the clergy, and the giving of both bread and wine to the laity. This led to resistance by the Protestant territories, who proclaimed their own Interim at Leipzig the following year.

The Interim was overthrown in 1552 by the revolt of the Protestant elector Maurice of Saxony and his allies. In the negotiations at Passau in the summer of 1552, even the Catholic princes had called for a lasting peace, fearing the religious controversy would never be settled. The emperor, however, was unwilling to recognize the religious division in Western Christendom as permanent. This document was foreshadowed by the Peace of Passau, which in 1552 gave Lutherans religious freedom after a victory by Protestant armies. Under the Passau document, Charles granted a peace only until the next imperial Diet, whose meeting was called in early 1555.

The treaty, negotiated on Charles' behalf by his brother, Ferdinand, effectively gave Lutheranism official status within the domains of the Holy Roman Empire, according to the policy of cuius regio, eius religio. Knights and towns who had practiced Lutheranism for some time were exempted under the Declaratio Ferdinandei, but the Ecclesiastical reservation supposedly prevented the principle of cuius regio, eius religio from being applied if an ecclesiastical ruler converted to Lutheranism.

Main principles

The Peace of Augsburg contained three main principles:

Those inhabitants who could not conform to the prince's religion were allowed to leave: an innovative idea in the 16th century. This principle was discussed at length by the various delegates, who finally reached agreement on the specifics of its wording after examining the problem and the proposed solution from every possible angle.
If the prelate of an ecclesiastic state changed his religion, the inhabitants of that state did not have to do so. Instead, the prelate was expected to resign from his post, although this was not spelled out in the agreement. 
This allowed for a few mixed cities and towns where Catholics and Lutherans had lived together. It also protected the authority of the princely families, the knights and some of the cities to determine what religious uniformity meant in their territories. Ferdinand inserted this at the last minute, on his own authority.

The third principle exempted knights and some of the cities under the jurisdiction of an ecclesiastical prince if they had practiced Lutheranism for some time (Lutheranism was the only branch of Protestantism recognized under the Peace). The provision was not publicized as part of the treaty, and was kept secret for almost two decades.

Problems
The document itself had critical problems. While it gave legal basis for the practice of the Lutheran confession, it did not accept any of the Reformed traditions, such as Calvinism, nor did it recognize Anabaptism.  Although the Peace of Augsburg was moderately successful in relieving tension in the empire and increasing tolerance, it left important things undone.  Neither the Anabaptists nor the Calvinists were protected under the peace, so many Protestant groups living under the rule of a Lutheran prince still found themselves in danger of the charge of heresy. (Article 17: "However, all such as do not belong to the two above named religions shall not be included in the present peace but be totally excluded from it.") These minorities did not achieve any legal recognition until the Peace of Westphalia in 1648.
The intolerance towards Calvinists caused them to take desperate measures that led to the Thirty Years' War.  One of the more notable measures was the Third Defenestration of Prague (1618) in which two representatives of the fiercely Catholic King of Bohemia Archduke Ferdinand (Matthias was Emperor until 20 March 1619) were thrown out of a castle window in Prague.

Aftermath

The principle of ecclesiastical reservation was tested in the Cologne War (1583–1588), which grew out of the scenario envisioned by Ferdinand when he wrote the proviso: the reigning prince-archbishop, Hermann of Wied, converted to Protestantism; although he did not insist that the population convert, he placed Calvinism on a parity with Catholicism throughout the Electorate of Cologne.  This in itself came forth as a two-fold legal problem: first, Calvinism was considered a heresy; second, the elector did not resign his see, which made him eligible, at least in theory, to cast a ballot for emperor.  Finally, his marriage posed a very real potential to convert the electorate into a dynastic principality, shifting the balance of religious power in the empire.

A side effect of the religious turmoil was Charles' decision to abdicate and divide Habsburg territory into two sections.  His brother Ferdinand ruled the Austrian lands, and Charles' fervently Catholic son, Philip II, became administrator of Spain, the Spanish Netherlands, parts of Italy, and other overseas holdings.

Notes

Bibliography
 Holborn, Hajo. A History of Modern Germany, The Reformation. Princeton: Princeton University Press, 1959 [1982], .

Further reading

External links

Full text of the "Peace of Augsburg" 
Brittanica's words on the "Peace of Augsburg"

1555 in law
1555 in Europe
16th century in Bavaria
Augsburg
Augsburg
History of Augsburg
Diplomatic conferences in Germany
16th-century diplomatic conferences
1555 treaties
1555 in the Holy Roman Empire
Schmalkaldic War